Diceratura diceratops is a species of moth from the Tortricidae family. It is found in north-eastern Afghanistan.

References

Moths described in 1967
Cochylini